{| border=1 align="right" cellpadding=4 cellspacing=0 width=300 style="margin: 0 0 1em 1em; background: #f9f9f9; border: 1px #aaaaaa solid; border-collapse: collapse; font-size: 95%;"
|+ style="font-size: larger;"|Centro Desportivo São Bernardo
|-
|align="center" colspan=2|

|-
|Club Name|| São Bernardo
|-
|Image||
|-
|Foundation||1974
|-
|Arena||Gimnodesportivo de São Bernardo,  Aveiro  Portugal.
|-
|Manager||  João Alves
|-
|Assistant Coach||  João Maio
|-
|Physio||  
|-
|Director||  José Tide
|-
|League||Andebol 2 - FAP
|-
|Position 2010-11||7th of Andebol 1                
|-
|Website||http://www.cdsbernardo.pt.vu
|}São Bernardo''' Is a professional handball team based in São Bernardo, Aveiro, Portugal founded in 1974. It has played in Campeonato Nacional de Andebol for several years.

Achievements

 Champion of Divisão de Elite - 2
 Champion of Andebol 2 - 3

Current Squad 2018/19

Portuguese handball clubs
Sport in Aveiro, Portugal